Nef or NEF may refer to:

Businesses and organizations
 National Energy Foundation, a British charity
 National Enrichment Facility, an American uranium enrichment plant
 New Economics Foundation, a British think-tank
 Near East Foundation, an American international social and economic development organization
 National Equity Fund, Inc., an American non-profit syndicator of Low Income Housing Tax Credits 
 New England Firearms, a brand of H&R Firearms

People
 Abdou Nef (1995–2013), Algerian footballer
 Adolfo Nef (born 1946), Chilean football goalkeeper
 Alain Nef (born 1982), Swiss footballer
 Francisco Nef (1863–1931), Chilean naval officer and member of the government junta 
Hospital Naval Almirante Nef
 Hari Nef (born 1992), American actress, model, and writer
 Isabelle Nef (1895–1976), Swiss pianist and harpsichordist
 John Ulric Nef (chemist) (1862–1915), discoverer of the Nef reaction
 John Ulric Nef (economic historian) (1899–1988)
 Karl Nef (1873–1935), Swiss musicologist
 Roland Nef (born 1959), chief of the Swiss Armed Forces in 2008
 Sonja Nef (born 1972), Swiss skier
 Tanguy Nef (born 1996), Swiss skier
 Walter Nef (1919–2013), Swiss mathematician after whom the Nef polygon is named
 Nef the Pharaoh (Tonee Hayes, born 1995), American rapper

Places
Nef Glacier, Chile
Nef River, Chile

Science and technology

Biology and chemistry
 Nef (protein) (Negative Regulatory Factor) 
 Nef reaction
 Nef synthesis
 Nef isocyanide reaction
 Nucleotide exchange factor
 S100B, a protein, alias NEF

Mathematics
 Nef line bundle, in algebraic geometry
 Natural exponential family, in probability and statistics

Other uses
 Nef (ship), French name for a three- or four-masted ocean-going sailing ship
 Nef (metalwork), a table ornament in the shape of a ship
 .nef, or Nikon Electronic Format, a type of raw image format
 Notice of electronic filing, issued by the U.S. court system
 NEF College, in Guwahati, India 
 NEF Law College, in Guwahati, India
 Nefamese, a pidgin language, ISO 639-3 language code nef

See also

 La Nef (disambiguation)
 Neff, a surname
 Neff GmbH, a German kitchen appliance manufacturer 
 Nave (French: nef)
 Order of the Ship (French: Ordre de la Nef), a secular order of knighthood in the Kingdom of Naples